Antwerp-Noorderdokken is a railway station in the city of Antwerp, Antwerp, Belgium. The station opened on 26 May 1974 on the Antwerp–Lage Zwaluwe railway, known in Belgium as Line 12 and also Line 27A, a freight line to the port of Antwerp.

Train services
The station is served by the following services:

Local services (L-22) Roosendaal - Essen - Antwerp - Puurs (weekdays)
Local services (L-22) Roosendaal - Essen - Antwerp (weekends)

Bus services 
Bus lines 760 and 761 serve the station, these are operated by De Lijn.

External links
belgianrail.be

Railway stations opened in 1974
Railway stations in Belgium
Railway stations in Antwerp
Public transport in Antwerp
Buildings and structures in Antwerp